The Women's Windsurfing RS:X is a sailing event on the Sailing at the Southeast Asian Games programme at the National Sailing Centre.

Schedule
All times are Singapore Standard Time (UTC+08:00)

Results
 

Notes
If sailors are disqualified or do not complete the race, 7 points are assigned for that race with 6 boats, 6 points for race with 5 boats, and 5 points for race with 4 boats

Scoring abbreviations are defined as follows:
OCS – On course side of the starting line
DSQ – Disqualified
DNF – Did Not Finish
DNS – Did Not Start

References

Women's Windsurfing RS:X
Windsurfing at multi-sport events
Women's sports competitions in Singapore
RS:X competitions
South